The Natural Fibre Company (TNFC) is a wool mill based in Launceston, Cornwall, England, and is the only small-scale full range textile mill in the UK.

The focus of the business is to add value to naturally coloured raw fleece which it buys from farmers, smallholders and rare sheep breeders. Through this commission spinning work it is providing support in the preservation of rare breed sheep and is helping to improve commercial returns within the wool industry.

It is one of only a handful of mills worldwide that processes yarn in small quantities for craftspeople and smaller businesses.

Company history
The Natural Fibre Company has been spinning wool since 1991. Following its takeover and relocation to Cornwall in 2005, TNFC launched its own brand of wool products, Blacker Designs.

Although the company was started in Merthyr Tydfil, Wales, by Myra Mortlock in 1991 to spin wool on a small scale, largely for smallholders, it was a continuation of a business bought from Rose Elworthy who had launched it in the mid-1980s.

With her husband Philip, Myra produced natural and undyed wool in the traditional way, later moving the business to an industrial unit at Lampeter in mid-Wales before selling it to Sue Blacker after the Mortlocks decided to retire in 2004.

Sue Blacker had a small flock of Gotland sheep and was a TNFC customer. She approached other customers with a research survey to determine exactly what they wanted and put together a business plan approved for European Union Objective One funding in the spring of 2005.

TNFC was taken over from the Mortlocks on 14 November 2005 and relocated to a  factory at Launceston in Cornwall close to the Devon border.

The company today
The Natural Fibre Company scours, cards, spins and dyes fibre on both woollen and worsted systems, working in batches upwards of 20 kilos. There are also organic production runs.

In addition to advising sheep owners how to get the best fibre from their flocks and turn it into a form they can sell, The Natural Fibre Company is increasingly buying wool from its customers for use in its own range of products, Blacker Designs.

This new direction for the TNFC started in 2005 when managing director Sue Blacker and her family bought the company from its previous owners. It received help from European Union Objective One funding, outside investors and fund managers Finance Cornwall.

All the wool going through the mill is British and includes some from the Falklands Islands.

External links
 TNFC website

Companies based in Cornwall
Launceston, Cornwall
Manufacturing companies established in 1991
1991 establishments in England